The Lapicini were an ancient Ligurian tribe mentioned by Livy as being subjugated by Rome under consuls Marcus Aemilius Lepidus and Quintus Mucius Scaevola in 175 BCE. (Liv. xli. 19.)  They inhabited the extreme northern regions of Liguria, as it was defined in Roman times, on a tributary of the Magra river.

References

Ligures
Tribes conquered by the Roman Republic
Tribes conquered by Rome